Stepping Along is a lost 1926 American silent comedy film directed by Charles Hines and starring Johnny Hines, Mary Brian and William Gaxton.

Cast
 Johnny Hines as Johnny Rooney 
 Mary Brian as Molly Taylor 
 William Gaxton as Frank Moreland 
 Ruth Dwyer as Fay Allen 
 Edmund Breese as Prince Ferdinand Darowitsky 
 Dan Mason as Mike 
 Lee Beggs as Boss O'Brien

References

Bibliography
 Munden, Kenneth White. The American Film Institute Catalog of Motion Pictures Produced in the United States, Part 1. University of California Press, 1997.

External links

1926 films
Silent American comedy films
Lost American films
Films directed by Charles Hines
American silent feature films
1920s English-language films
First National Pictures films
American black-and-white films
1926 comedy films
1926 lost films
Lost comedy films
1920s American films